Concrete Romance (literally "Reinforced Concrete") is a 2007  Italian neo-noir film directed by Marco Martani.

Plot 
The young restless Diego Santini accidentally collides with a mobster boxwood, called "Primary". The gangster wants at all costs to avenge the offense of Diego: he tries to kill Dieg's best friend, then shoots his mother, and finally humiliates Diego by making him believe police the culprit. Diego, trying to kill his enemy, he discovers that the primary years earlier killed his father, humiliating him in front of everyone, making him believe a "failed". So Diego, furious, following the primary to a bridge and jumps. Both fall into the void.

Cast 

Nicolas Vaporidis: Diego Santini
Giorgio Faletti: Il Primario
Carolina Crescentini: Asia
Dario Cassini: Silvio Cola
Ninetto Davoli: Pompo
Matteo Urzia: Samuele

References

External links

2007 films
Italian crime films
2000s crime films
Italian neo-noir films
2007 directorial debut films
2000s Italian films